The 1933 Boston Braves season was the 63rd season of the franchise.

Offseason 
 December 29, 1932: Shanty Hogan was purchased by the Braves from the New York Giants for $25,000.

Regular season

Season standings

Record vs. opponents

Notable transactions 
 July 31, 1933: Bob Smith was selected off waivers by the Braves from the Cincinnati Reds.

Roster

Player stats

Batting

Starters by position 
Note: Pos = Position; G = Games played; AB = At bats; H = Hits; Avg. = Batting average; HR = Home runs; RBI = Runs batted in

Other batters 
Note: G = Games played; AB = At bats; H = Hits; Avg. = Batting average; HR = Home runs; RBI = Runs batted in

Pitching

Starting pitchers 
Note: G = Games pitched; IP = Innings pitched; W = Wins; L = Losses; ERA = Earned run average; SO = Strikeouts

Other pitchers 
Note: G = Games pitched; IP = Innings pitched; W = Wins; L = Losses; ERA = Earned run average; SO = Strikeouts

Relief pitchers 
Note: G = Games pitched; W = Wins; L = Losses; SV = Saves; ERA = Earned run average; SO = Strikeouts

Farm system

Notes

References 
1933 Boston Braves season at Baseball Reference

Boston Braves seasons
Boston Braves
Boston Braves
1930s in Boston